Bijaq (also Romanized as Bījaq) is a village in Meshgin-e Sharqi Rural District, in the Central District of Meshgin Shahr County, Ardabil Province, Iran. At the 2006 census, its population was 911, in 227 families.

References 

Tageo

Towns and villages in Meshgin Shahr County